The Brussels International Fantastic Film Festival (BIFFF), previously named Brussels International Festival of Fantastic Film was created in 1983 as a venue for horror, thriller and science fiction films.  It takes place in Brussels, every year in March. Initially organized by Annie Bozzo, Gigi Etienne, Freddy Bozzo, Georges Delmote and Guy Delmote, it now has prizes in both feature-length and short films, and also hosts an international body-painting competition.

The festival is accredited by the FIAPF as a competitive specialised film festival. Winners of the grand prize, the Golden Raven statuette, include Army of Darkness, Radioactive Dreams, and Dog Soldiers.

Winners of the Golden Raven

See also
B-movie
European Fantastic Film Festivals Federation

Other genre film festivals
 Sitges Film Festival
 MOTELx - Lisbon International Horror Film Festival
 Fantasporto
 Fantasia International Film Festival
 Fantastic Fest
 Screamfest Horror Film Festival
 Puchon International Fantastic Film Festival
 Dead by Dawn
 Fantafestival
 International Horror and Sci-Fi Film Festival
 New York City Horror Film Festival
 Toronto After Dark Film Festival
 TromaDance

References

External links

Brussels International Fantastic Film Festival at the Internet Movie Database

Film festivals in Belgium
Culture in Brussels
Fantasy and horror film festivals
Tourist attractions in Brussels
Film festivals established in 1983
Spring (season) events in Belgium
Science fiction film festivals